The prickly toadfish (Contusus richei) is a pufferfish of the family Tetraodontidae, found in the eastern Indian Ocean and the southwest Pacific Ocean, at depths down to 50 m.  Its length is up to 25 cm.

References

 
 Tony Ayling & Geoffrey Cox, Collins Guide to the Sea Fishes of New Zealand,  (William Collins Publishers Ltd, Auckland, New Zealand 1982) 

Tetraodontidae
Fish described in 1813